Michel Rio (born 7 March 1963) is a French former professional footballer who played as a midfielder.

Career 

Rio played at a professional level in the Division 1 (later renamed Ligue 1) for Nantes, Metz, Caen and Le Havre, and in the Division 2 (later renamed Ligue 2) for Guingamp and Stade Briochin. He made 237 total appearances in the Division 1, scoring 29 goals.

On 15 February 1992, Rio scored the fastest goal in Division 1 history, putting the ball in the back of net after eight seconds of play in an encounter between Caen and Cannes. On 21 August 2022, over thirty years later, Paris Saint-Germain forward Kylian Mbappé scored a goal against Lille that was clocked at eight seconds as well, thereby equalling Rio's longstanding record. However, according to newspaper L'Équipe and several other calculations, Mbappé's goal was scored slightly later, signifying that Rio's record remained unmatched.

External links

1963 births
Living people
French footballers
Ligue 1 players
Ligue 2 players
French Division 3 (1971–1993) players
French Division 4 (1978–1993) players
Championnat National players
Championnat National 3 players
US Montagnarde players
Stade Briochin players
En Avant Guingamp players
FC Nantes players
FC Metz players
Stade Malherbe Caen players
Le Havre AC players
Association football midfielders
French football managers